Vitaliy Mykolayovych Rudenko (born 26 January 1981, in Odessa, Soviet Union, now Ukraine) is a football goalkeeper.

Career
Rudenko is a product of the Chornomorets Odesa youth system. Having spent a few years playing in lower divisions, in 1999 he was brought in to the senior team of Chornomorets as cover for Hennadiy Altman. The following season he was battling for the starting position and becoming first choice keeper for Chornomorets in the 2001–02 season. He has since solidified his position as the number one keeper with a series of consistent seasons for the club.

Following the relegation of Chornomorets from the Ukrainian Premier League at the end of the 2009–10 season, Rudenko joined FC Karpaty Lviv. Having limited opportunities behind the first-choice Karpaty goalkeeper and captain Andriy Tlumak, Rudenko went on loan to FC Metalurh Zaporizhya during the 2010–2011 winter break.

Rudenko has represented Ukraine at all levels but senior. In 2000, he was part of the team that won the silver medal at the European Under-18 Football Championship.

See also
 2001 FIFA World Youth Championship squads#Ukraine

External links
Stats on Odessa Football site

1981 births
Living people
Ukrainian footballers
Ukraine under-21 international footballers
Ukraine youth international footballers
FC Chornomorets Odesa players
SC Odesa players
FC Karpaty Lviv players
FC Metalurh Zaporizhzhia players
Ukrainian Premier League players
Association football goalkeepers
Footballers from Odesa